Kızılcıklı Mahmut Pehlivan (b. 1878 or 1880 in Kızılcık village near Silistra, Principality of Bulgaria (a vassal state under the suzerainty of the Ottoman Empire) – d. February 3, 1931 in Eskişehir, Turkey) was a Turkish wrestler foremost known for his victory over Tom Jenkins in 1908 and loss to Frank Gotch in 1909 during a North American tour.

Given Yusuf İsmail's fame, American professional wrestling promoters chose to launch Mahmut with the ring name Youssouf Mahmout as the son of Yusuf İsmail and further, "the Terrible Turk", a moniker originally carried by Yusuf İsmail.

A main street in Eskişehir, the Anatolian city he later settled is named after him.

References

Further reading 
"Mahmout Tells Of His Early Life; Turkish Farms Breed Wrestlers. Bulgarian Grappler Who Is Picked as a Likely Opponent for Champion Frank Gotch Describes Training and Conditions in Land of Sultan, Where 100 Contestants Often Participate at Big Festivals." Chicago Tribune. 13 Dec. 1908.

External links 

 A photograph of the athlete (in PDF format) and caption from a Nov. 27, 1908, edition of La Patrie, a now-defunct French-language daily newspaper in Montreal. (Translated into English, the headline reads: "A Wrestling Champion" and the caption reads: "Youssouf Mahmout, victor over Tom Jenkins in a match last night at Madison Square Garden.") He is described in a story on the same page as "the Terrible Turk."

19th-century births
1931 deaths
Turkish professional wrestlers
People from Silistra Province
Bulgarian emigrants to Turkey